Vladyslav Kosov (born 31 August 2002 in Chernihiv) is a Ukrainian footballer who plays as a  defender.

Career
Shumilo is a product of the Olimpik Donetsk youth system, playing with the under-18 squad in 2017–18 and in the under-21 squad in 2018–19.

Chernihiv 
In 2020 he moved to Chernihiv, just promoted in Ukrainian Second League. On 7 November 2020 he made his debut against Podillya Khmelnytskyi. In summer 2021 his contract with the club was terminated.

Career statistics

Club

References

External links
 Profile on Official website of Ukrainian Second League
 

Living people
2000 births
Footballers from Chernihiv
Ukrainian footballers
Association football defenders
FC Chernihiv players
FC Olimpik Donetsk players
Ukrainian Second League players